The following is a list of current, and former professional baseball stadiums in Seattle, Washington. The list consists of only known stadiums. In all, there were nine known professional baseball parks in the city of Seattle. Of those nine, three stadiums have housed a Major League Baseball franchise. The first stadiums was played on in 1892 by the Seattle Hustlers. The only current stadium is T-Mobile Park, the home of the Seattle Mariners, a Major League Baseball franchise.

Stadiums

See also
List of Major League Baseball stadiums

References

External links

Seattle Pilots.com: minor league history
Seattle Pilots.com: Sick's Stadium 
Seattle Mariners.com: Safeco Field

 01
Seattle
Lists of buildings and structures in Washington (state)
Major League Baseball lists
Seattle
baseball stadiums
Baseball stadiums